Vel Tech Rangarajan Dr. Sagunthala R&D Institute of Science and Technology, formerly known as Vel Tech Dr. RR & Dr.SR University and commonly referred to as Vel Tech, is a private institute located in Avadi, Chennai, Tamil Nadu. It offers undergraduate, postgraduate and Doctoral programmes in engineering and technology, in addition to a Master of Business Administration and Polytechnic. It consists of four other campuses such as the Multi Tech, High Tech, VTRS, School of Media Technology & Communication And the Arts and Science.

History
Vel Tech was established in 1997 by Dr. R. Rangarajan and Dr. Sagunthala Rangarajan as an engineering college affiliated to the University of Madras , with courses in computer science & engineering, electronics & communication engineering and electrical & electronics engineering. From 2001 the college was affiliated to Anna University. The college was recognised as a deemed-to-be-university in 2008.

Accreditation
In November 2014 Vel Tech received Tier I accreditation from the National Board of Accreditation for its aeronautical and mechanical engineering undergraduate programs. In December 2015 the university was accredited with an "A" grade by the National Assessment and Accreditation Council. law. In February 2023 , the university was accredited with an "A++" grade (the highest grade) by the National Assessment and Accreditation Council. law.

Rankings 

Vel Tech was ranked 83 among the engineering colleges in India by the National Institutional Ranking Framework (NIRF) in 2022.

Academic activities
Vel Tech has adapted the new pedagogical process called "Conceive-Design-Implement-Operate" (CDIO) approach. CDIO imbibed syllabus helps the students to acquire professional, personal and inter-personal skills systematically.

Location
The campus is located in the Outer Ring Road in West Chennai, Avadi. The nearest airport is Chennai and the nearest railway station is Avadi.

Academics 
Academic programmes are offered in engineering, management, media technology and law. The academic curriculum of the institution facilitates collaborative learning with research projects and taught by committed faculty members, leading experts from industries/organizations and international visiting faculty.

The Choice Based Credit System (CBCS) gives student's flexibility to choose the course of their choice and learn at their own pace. CDIO methodology is also practiced in the curriculum, an innovative educational framework for producing the next generation of Engineers. The Institution is the first member from India to implement and practice CDIO methodology.

School of Sciences and Humanities
School of Computing
School of Electrical and Communication
School of Mechanical and Construction
School of Management
Department of Biological Sciences & Engineering
School of Law
School of Media Technology & Communication

References

External links

All India Council for Technical Education
Chennai
Universities in Chennai
Engineering colleges in Chennai
Educational institutions established in 1997
1997 establishments in Tamil Nadu
Academic institutions formerly affiliated with the University of Madras